Nival may refer to:

 objects, organisms or places related to snow
 Nival zone highest vegetation zone in alpine regions
 Nival (company), a global video game developing company
 National Irish Visual Arts Library (NIVAL), is a public research resource dedicated to the documentation of 20th and 21st century Irish visual art and design.